Santa Bahadur Rai(सन्त बहादुर राई: Lohorung, November 2, 1936) is former chairman of National planning commission and secretary of Ministry of Housing and physical planning of the government of Nepal.

Education
 1954: S.L.C (School Leaving Certificate), Government High School Darjeeling, India
 1954 - 1956: I.Sc (Intermediate of Science), Government College Darjeeling, India
 1956 - 1958: B.A. (Bachelor of Arts), Government College Darjeeling, India
 1959 - 1961: B.Ed. (Bachelor of Education), Tribhuwan University Kathmandu, Nepal
 1967 - 1969: M. Sc. (Master of Science), Michigan State University, United States

Career
 Chairman (Public Service Commission)
 Secretary (Ministry of Local Development, Ministry of Supply, Ministry of Housing and physical planning)
 Member of Raj Parishad 
 Member, Aug.1991 to 1993	Constitutional Public Service Commission	Position Kamal Pokhari, Kathmandu
 Chairman, Jan. 1994 to Nov. 3 2001 Chairman Public Service Commission	Kamal Pokhari, Kathmandu
Secretary, 1988-27 Aug 1991	Executive Chief of the Ministry of Housing and Physical Ministry Planning, His Majesty's Government
Secretary, 1986–1987, Executive Chief of the Ministry of Local Development Ministry His Majesty's Government
 Secretary, 1984-1986 Executive Chief of the Ministry of Supply, His Majesty's Government
 Additional Secretary, 1986-1987 Executive Chief of the Ministry of Panchyat and Ministry of Local Development His Majesty's Government
 Director General, Feb 1977 – Oct 1981 Ministry of Panchyat and Local Development His Majesty's Government
 Deputy Director, Jul 1972 – Jan 1977 Ministry of Panchyat and Ministry of Local Development, His Majesty's Government
 Chief Districts Officer (CDO), Oct 1969 – Jun 1972
 Local Development Officer, Apr 1961 – Sep 1969 (including 19 months in the US)

Awards
 Gorkha Dakshina Bahu
 Gorkha Dakshina Bahu (Fourth)

References

1936 births
Living people
People from Sankhuwasabha District
Lohorung
Tribhuvan University alumni
Michigan State University alumni
Nepalese civil servants
Rai people